The Deporte de Lazo or Competencia de Lazo is an equestrian sport of Panama, where it is among the most popular sporting events and is unofficially considered the national sport. The national association is the Federación Nacional de Lazo, which was formed in 1976.

References

Sports competitions in Panama
Equestrian sports
Working stock horse sports